The Boston Society of Film Critics Award for Best (Lead) Actress is one of the annual film awards given by the Boston Society of Film Critics.

Winners

1980s

1990s

2000s

2010s

2020s

Multiple winners

2 wins
Holly Hunter (1987, 1993)
Hilary Swank (1999, 2004)
Meryl Streep (1982, 2009)
Marion Cotillard (2007, 2014)
Sally Hawkins (2008, 2017)

References

Boston Society of Film Critics Awards
Film awards for lead actress